The olivocerebellar tract, also known as olivocerebellar fibers, are neural fibers which originate at the olivary nucleus and pass out through the hilum and decussate with those from the opposite olive in the raphe nucleus, then as internal arcuate fibers they pass partly through and partly around the opposite olive and enter the inferior peduncle to be distributed to the cerebellar hemisphere of the opposite side from which they arise.

They terminate directly on Purkinje cells as the climbing fiber input system.

References

External links

Cerebellar connections